Mikhail Anatolyevich Vasenkov (9 October 1942 – 6 April 2022) was a Soviet–Russian colonel, photojournalist, and spy, Hero of the Soviet Union (1990). He was part of the Illegals Program.

References

1942 births
2022 deaths
Soviet colonels
Soviet spies
Russian spies
Russian photojournalists
New York University alumni
Military personnel from Moscow
Heroes of the Soviet Union
Recipients of the Order of Courage
Recipients of the Order of Lenin
Recipients of the Order of the Red Banner
Recipients of the Order of the Red Star